Diving Unlimited International (DUI) is an American diving equipment designer and manufacturer. DUI is particularly well known among recreational and technical divers as the maker of high-end dry suits. DUI also manufactures dry suits and associated products for all the branches of the US military and friendly foreign military around the globe.

DUI has several patents related to diving equipment and dry suits. The company was founded in 1963 by Dick Long. DUI's manufacturing facility and main offices are located in San Diego, CA.

References

Diving equipment manufacturers
Manufacturing companies based in San Diego
Sporting goods manufacturers of the United States